Zavareh Bid (also Romanized as Zavāreh Bīd; also known as Zavār Bīd and ‘Alīābād-e Zavāreh Bīd) is a village in Tarand Rural District, Jalilabad District, Pishva County, Tehran Province, Iran. At the 2006 census, its population was 467, in 87 families.

References 

Populated places in Pishva County